Tselinny is a rural locality (a settlement) in Korotoyaksky Selsoviet, Khabarsky District, Altai Krai, Russia. The population was 612 as of 2013. There are 10 streets.

Geography 
Tselinny is located 22 km north of Khabary (the district's administrative centre) by road. Korotoyak is the nearest rural locality.

References 

Rural localities in Khabarsky District